The Woodbridge Cup is a rugby league competition run by the New South Wales Country Rugby League. It encompasses smaller senior clubs in the Mid-West and Central West of the state. The neighbouring Mid-West Cup competition's remaining clubs merged into the league in 2022 when that league initially folded (it has since re-formed without the teams that joined the Woodbridge Cup). For all intents and purposes, it is a second division competition in the Group 11 and from 2022, Group 10 areas.

History 
The competition began as the Group 9 Second Division in the 1940s, with clubs from towns such as Binalong, Stockinbingal and Boorowa among others. The competition has slowly moved north however, and effectively operates as the Group 11 Rugby League second division, with only Grenfell remaining from the Group 9 days, something that was reflected in the name change to the Woodbridge Cup in 1990. 

In 2022, the Mid West Cup (Group 10 Rugby League Second Division) merged into the competition, taking the competition from a total of 9 to 12 teams. Although that competition has re-formed, the teams that joined the Woodbridge Cup will not return to the competition.

Current clubs

There will be 12 clubs competing in the Woodbridge Cup in 2022, with three teams merging in from the now defunct Mid West Cup, including CSU Mungoes, Orange United Warriors (who have signed former NRL player Josh Dugan for the 2022 season) and ex-Group 10 Rugby League powerhouse Oberon Tigers.

Former Clubs
 Binalong Brahmans (moved to George Tooke Shield)
 Boorowa Rovers (moved to George Tooke Shield)
 Burrangong Bears (moved to George Tooke Shield)
 Gooloogong Cowboys (folded)
 Koorawatha Jets (folded)
 Monteagle (folded)
Quandialla (folded)
Stockinbingal (folded)
Bendick Murrell (folded)

Premierships

See also

Rugby League Competitions in Australia

References

External links
Country Rugby League Official site.

Rugby league competitions in New South Wales
1991 establishments in Australia
Sports leagues established in 1991